Steve Bovay (born 25 November 1984) is a Swiss former cyclist.

Major results
2004
3rd Road race, National Under-23 Road Championships
2006
6th Overall GP Tell
2007
5th Tour du Jura
2009
9th Overall Tour de Beauce

References

1984 births
Living people
Swiss male cyclists
People from Vevey
Sportspeople from the canton of Vaud